The Dominican Summer League Cubs or DSL Cubs are a rookie league affiliate of the Chicago Cubs based in the Dominican Republic. They play in the Boca Chica North Division of the Dominican Summer League.

History
The team began in 1991 with a joint affiliation with the Kansas City Royals.  An affiliation with the Colorado Rockies was added in 1992.

For the 1993 season, the team shared an affiliation with the Texas Rangers.  They then shared an affiliation with the San Diego Padres for the next three seasons (1994–1996).

The team became independently affiliated with the Cubs in 1997.  From 2008 to 2012, the team split into two squads as DSL Cubs 1 and DSL Cubs 2, but became a unified team again for the 2013 season.

Roster

References

Chicago Cubs minor league affiliates
Dominican Summer League teams
Baseball teams in the Dominican Republic